Cyril Despres (born 24 January 1974) is a French rally racer and resident of Andorra. He won the Dakar Rally five times, in 2005, 2007, 2010, 2012 and 2013, riding a KTM motorcycle. He also won the Red Bull Romaniacs, one of the toughest hard enduro events on the planet, three times, in 2004, 2005 and 2007 and the Erzberg Rodeo in 2002 and 2003. In the 2018 season he is one of the official drivers of the Team Peugeot Total.

Career
On 10 January 2012, at the 2012 Dakar Rally, Portuguese pilot Paulo Gonçalves pulled Despres out of the mud but Cyril did not return the favour. Out of 7 riders all but the Spaniard Marc Coma got stuck; the organisers therefore changed the course. At the end of the stage, the time lost was credited to Despres. Goncalves received a penalty of 6 hours for receiving external help. Coma was not credited the time he lost by going around the mudhole.

After a closely fought battle with his KTM teammate, Spaniard Marc Coma for the victory, Despres got back into the lead on the penultimate stage (Stage 13) thanks to a mechanical failure on Coma's bike. Despres managed to maintain the lead until the end of the rally. Thus Cyril Despres gained his fourth overall victory on the Dakar Rally, equaling former Honda and Cagiva rider, Italian Edi Orioli's performance.

A new chapter began in his Dakar career in 2015 when he joined the Peugeot team as a driver alongside Carlos Sainz and Stéphane Peterhansel, who previously switched from the motorbike to car category with great success. His co-driver was Gilles Picard, and they finished 34th. In 2016 Despres came in 7th overall; his co-driver was David Castera.

In July 2016, he and Castera won the cars' category at the Silk Way Rally. Despres and his partner repeated their success in the next year.

Dakar Rally results

NOTE:  The ASO legally moved the 2008 Dakar race to Hungary and Romania following a terrorist attack in Mauritania by deferring all entries to the replacement event.

Other results
Cars
Silk Way Rally
 2016 (Peugeot 2008 DKR), 2017 (Peugeot 3008 DKR)

Bikes
 Tunisia Rally
 (2004, 2005, 2009)
 (2003)
 (2000)
 Orient Rally 
 (2005)
 Rallye du Maroc 
 (2000, 2003, 2010, 2012)
 Brazil Rally 
 (2006, 2011)
 (2007, 2009, 2013)
 Rally dos Sertões 
 (2009)

References

External links 
 
 Driver profile  at Worldrallyraid.com
 Driver profile at Dakar.com
 Driver profile at Lerepairedesmotards.com

1974 births
Living people
Andorran sportspeople
Dakar Rally drivers
Dakar Rally motorcyclists
Dakar Rally winning drivers
French motocross riders
Off-road motorcycle racers
Enduro riders
Peugeot Sport drivers